The Caju River is a river of Roraima state in northern Brazil.

See also
List of rivers of Roraima

References
Brazilian Ministry of Transport

Rivers of Roraima